Hijab Imtiaz Ali (1908–1999) was a writer, editor and diarist. She is a well known name in the Urdu literature and a pioneer of romanticism in Urdu. She is also considered as the first female Muslim pilot after she obtained her official pilot license in 1936.

Personal life 
Hijab was born in Hyderabad (1908). She was from an aristocratic family of the Princely state of Hyderabad Deccan. Hijab is a notable name in Urdu literature. She started writing at a very young age. One of her best-known works “Meri Natamam Mohabbat”, which is considered one of the best love stories ever written in Urdu literature, was written at the age of twelve.

In the 1930s, Hijab married Imtiaz Ali Taj, a well-known writer and journalist who wrote for many films, dramas and radio channels. She moved to Lahore with him. Hijab had one daughter, Yasmin Tahir who went on to become a notable voice in radio Pakistan. Hijab's grandsons, Faran Tahir and Ali Tahir are actors.

Career

Pilot 
Hijab was passionate about flying. She trained in Lahore Flying Club and also took part in many competitions organized by the club. Hijab obtained her pilot's license in 1936. in 1939, The International Women’s News reported in 1939 that Begum Hijab Imtiaz Ali had become the first Muslim woman in the British Empire to obtain an ‘A’ license as an air pilot. Sarla Thakral, is often claimed as the first Indian pilot, however both Sarla and Hijab obtained the license around the same time but Hijab was became the first.

Writer 
Hijab, whose writing career spans over more than 60 years, is known for her romantic stories in Urdu literature. Her stories revolve around romance, women, nature and psychology. Her writing was often related to reality and contained a lot of imagery of life. Her repeated use of words and a unique construction of sentences, stands out in her writing. Hijab's stories used the same characters in different stories and scenarios. Some of the famous and memorable characters from her novels are Dr Gaar, Sir Harley, Dadi Zubeida, and Habshan Zonash.

Hijab became an author at an early age. She published her first short story at the age of 9. Her story was published in 'Tehzeeb-e-Niswan' and enjoyed by the readers. Her stories were published by two popular magazines of the era, namely ‘Tehzeeb-e-Nizwaan’ and ‘Phool’. She also worked as an editor for both the magazines.At the age of 12, Hijab wrote her first novel "Meri Natamam Mohabbat" which is considered one of the best love stories written in the Urdu language. Some of her famous works are Lail-o-Nihar, Sanober Kay Saey May, Meri Natamaam Muhubbat and Tasveer-e-Butaa’n. She is considered the first woman in subcontinent to publish short stories that gained recognition.

She published a few short story collections and also translated Louisa May Alcott’s famous novel Little Women in Urdu.

Hijab was also a diarist. Her diaries were published in magazines and some of them were also published as books. One of her novels, Mombatti ke Samne(In front of the Candle) was based on her experiences in Lahore during the 1965 Indo-Pak war. The name came because Hijab used to write the diary in candle light during the war blackouts. Her experience of the war also inspired her to write award winning novel Pagal Khana (Madhouse), which was also her last novel. She studied the psychologist Sigmund Freud study, which served as an inspiration for this novel.

Publications 
Some of her well known publications are

 Zalim Muhabbat
 Leyl-u Nihar
 Sanobar ke Sae
 Adab-ı Zerin, İhtiyat-e Aşk
 Pagalkhana
 Tasvir-i Botan 
 Voh Baharin Yeh Khizayan
 Andhera Huab 
 Meri Natamam Muhabbat

Death 
Hijab died on 19 March 1999 in her home in Model Town, Lahore.

References

External links 
 Imtiyaz Ali biography
 Hijab Imtiaz Ali books

Indian women writers
Indian writers
1908 births
1999 deaths
Urdu-language writers from Pakistan
Urdu-language writers from British India
Pakistani women
Indian women aviators
People from Hyderabad, India
Pakistani people of Hyderabadi descent